Tom Mulholland (born 1968) is an American football coach. He served as the head coach for the Catholic Cardinals football team at The Catholic University of America in 2002 and 2003, compiled a record of 7–13.

Early life
Mulholland was born and grew up in Bethesda, Maryland. He attended Gonzaga College High School, from which he graduated in 1986. He then attended The Catholic University of America and graduated in 1992 with a bachelor of arts degree in sociology.

Coaching career
Mulholland served for one season as an assistant coach at Towson University in Towson, Maryland. The following year, he returned to his alma mater. He served for ten years as a defensive positional coach and defensive coordinator at Catholic.

In August 2002, Catholic head coach Rob Ambrose resigned in order to become the quarterbacks coach at Connecticut, and Mulholland was promoted as his replacement. He held that position for two seasons, and his teams compiled records of 4–6 (ODAC: 2–4) in 2002 and 3–7 (ODAC: 2–4) in 2003. In those seasons, Catholic finished sixth and fifth out of seven teams in the Old Dominion Athletic Conference (ODAC), respectively. Mulholland was fired and eventually replaced by former Catholic head coach Tom Clark.

In 2006, Mulholland became head coach for the Walter Johnson High School football team, which had posted a 0–10 record the prior season. The team continued its losing record, expanding it to a 36-game losing streak, before defeating Poolesville High School in the seventh game of the 2008 season.

Mulholland is married with three children and currently resides in Gaithersburg, Maryland.

Head coaching record

College

References

1968 births
Living people
Catholic University Cardinals football coaches
Catholic University Cardinals football players
Towson Tigers football coaches
High school football coaches in Maryland
People from Bethesda, Maryland
Players of American football from Maryland